''This is a sub-article to Synagogues of Kraków

The Wolf Popper Synagogue, located in Kraków, Poland, was a place of worship from its founding in 1620 until 1965. It used to be one of the most splendid Jewish houses of prayer in the old Jewish quarter of Kazimierz. The Synagogue was founded by the eponymous Wolf Popper. Its entrance was once adorned with openwork doors depicting four animals: an eagle, a leopard, a lion, and a buck deer, which symbolize the main traits of a devout man. The synagogue, featuring porches, annexes, Aron Kodesh, rich furniture and decorations, went into a decline not long after the passing of its founder and chief benefactor. At present, Popper Synagogue serves as bookshop and also as an art gallery in the women's area upstairs.

Wolf Popper, nicknamed "The Stork" for having been able to stand on one leg when lost in deep thought, founded the synagogue in 1620. He financed its construction towards the end of his life. Popper made his fortune in large-scale international trade in cloth and saltpetre (main ingredient in the making of gunpowder), and eventually became Kazimierz's richest banker with a fortune reaching 200,000 zloty, making him one of the richest men in Europe.

The Popper family lost much of its wealth following Wolf Popper's death in main part due to historical wars, local epidemics, fires, and costly tributes of allegiance. The once-grand synagogue never again enjoyed the wealth of its original sponsor, who was the only person that could prevent its slow but unrelenting decline. The rich interior was destroyed by the Nazis during World War II. Its arabesque doors were moved to the Wolfson Museum in Jerusalem.

In 1965, the Jewish Council handed over the building to the communist authorities. In the ensuing renovation, most traces of its previous religious role were erased and the Old Town Youth Cultural Centre (YCC) was established in its place. At present, the Centre is a vibrant and busy place with long-running programs, educational activities, art studio, and classes in Jewish dance. The YCC Study Workshop on Jewish History and Culture, is an initiative that began in 1995 as the first of its kind in Poland. Art classes are designed to widen the students' knowledge of symbolism and artistic motifs in Jewish art. An annual competition in art and photography is being held there as well as lectures on Jewish Kazimierz, the Holocaust, and a series of film showings.

Notable members
Family of Edward Mosberg

See also
Culture of Kraków
History of Jews in Poland
Chronology of Jewish Polish history
 Synagogues of Krakow 
 Remuh Synagogue 
 Tempel Synagogue
 Old Synagogue (Krakow)
 Izaak Synagogue
 High Synagogue (Kraków)
 Kupa Synagogue

Notes

References

Marek Strzala, Synagogues of the Kazimierz district
Aneta Kalemba, Poland: Online presentation
Steven Spielberg's Righteous Persons' Foundation, "Exploring the Synagogues of Poland" from the Internet Archive
The Jewish Community of Krakow
The New York Times, Sir Isaac and Lady Edith  Wolfson Museum  In Heichal Shlomo, King George St., Jerusalem
The  Wolfson Museum King George Street, Jerusalem

Former synagogues in Poland
Synagogues in Kraków
Holocaust locations in Poland